Chetwood Creek is a stream in Madera County, California, in the United States.

Chetwood Creek was named for a local cowman.

See also
List of rivers of California

References

Rivers of Madera County, California
Rivers of Northern California